A Lord Ordinary is any judge in the Outer House of the Scottish Court of Session.

References

Court of Session
Scots law legal terminology
Judiciary of Scotland